John Louis Richardson (born May 13, 1964) is an American drummer who has worked in rock and alt-country with such artists as Gin Blossoms, Badfinger, Wilco guitarist Jay Bennett, and 2012 CMA Song of the Year nominee Will Hoge. He is also owner of Drum Farm Studio in Menomonie, Wisconsin.

Career

Early career
Born in Champaign, Illinois, John Louis Richardson started his professional career in 1980 with seminal Champaign-Urbana band The Martyrs. John was a founding member, along with fellow high school friends Kent Whitesell, Chris Bowe and Charles Andrews. The Martyrs reunited in 2010 for the re-release of their eponymous first album (originally released in 1983) and two live shows at the High Dive in Champaign, Illinois, on January 21 and 22, 2011. He also played in Champaign-Urbana bands Nix86 and The Vertebrats.

Tommy Keene
On the release of Tommy Keene's Based on Happy Times in 1989, Richardson was recruited to play drums for the subsequent tour (along with Brad Quinn on bass) opening for The Replacements. He played on all Tommy Keene's following albums and tours from 1992 to 2009.

Joey Molland of Badfinger
Richardson was tagged to play drums for Joey Molland (Badfinger) in 1990. He has toured the US, Canada and Europe with Molland/Badfinger and played drums on Molland's solo album, The Pilgrim, released in 1992.

Gin Blossoms
From 2008 to 2012, Richardson played drums for the Gin Blossoms, touring all over the world and recording on their 2010 album, No Chocolate Cake. The band announced on its website on March 4, 2012, that Richardson had left the band to pursue other recording and performing projects. The band stated in its news release, "John is a great drummer and all of us support his passion for recording. We all wish him the very best and thank him for all his hard work and dedication."

Will Hoge

Richardson played with Will Hoge in 2012, touring across the US and playing the venerable Ryman Auditorium for the Grand Ole Opry.

Associations

Touring
Richardson has toured with many artists, including Will Hoge, Gin Blossoms, Badfinger, Tommy Keene, Shoes, Catchpenny, Adam Schmitt, Garrison Starr, Tim Easton, The Bad Examples, Ralph's World, Three Hour Tour, Weird Summer and the Bay City Rollers. He has toured throughout the United States and in Canada, Japan, England, France, Spain, Holland, Belgium, The Philippines, Brazil, Kuwait, Iraq, El Salvador and Honduras.

Recording
In the studio, he has played drums for Gin Blossoms, Joey Molland (Badfinger), Paul Chastain (Velvet Crush, Matthew Sweet), Tommy Keene, Shoes, Adam Schmitt, Keene Brothers (Robert Pollard and Tommy Keene), Garrison Starr, Robynn Ragland, The Bad Examples, Three Hour Tour, Weird Summer, Jay Bennett (Wilco), Billy Davis (Foghat), Randy Forte & the Reconstruction, Raymond Maclean, and The Dygmies.

He has worked with producers Jonathan Pines, Adam Schmitt and Mark Rubel (Champaign); Ken Coomer formerly of Wilco and Uncle Tupelo, Tom Bukovac and Joe Baldridge (Nashville); R Walt Vincent and Danny Wilde of The Rembrandts (Los Angeles); Otto D'Agnolo (Phoenix); Willie Wells  (Woodstock, New York); and Jeff Murphy of Shoes (Chicago).

Fellow musicians
Richardson has performed and/or recorded with musicians including Tom Bukovac, Audley Freed (Black Crowes), John Lancaster (Gary Allan), David LaBruyere (John Mayer), Brad Rice (Keith Urban), Brad Jones (Matthew Sweet, Tommy Keene), Ethan Pilzer (Billy Joe Shaver, Jewel, Big & Rich, Jay Bennett (Wilco) and Paul Chastain (Velvet Crush, Matthew Sweet).

Media

Television appearances
Richardson has performed on Fox News All-American New Year's Eve and Twelve News Phoenix – Downtown Goes Live (with Gin Blossoms), Late Night with Conan O'Brien (with Tommy Keene), WGN News (with Shoes and WGN Morning News) and with Ralph's World).

Equipment

Richardson is currently sponsored by Maple Works Drums, Evans Drumheads, Paiste Cymbals, Vic Firth, Groove Juice, Slug Percussion, Heritage Cajon and  Alclair In-Ear Monitors.

Discography

Albums and EPs
2018: Dichotomous Thinking, Elysium
2018: Randy Forte is Chas Randall, Randy Forte
2017: I Can Hardly Wait, Rich Kids
2017: Dawn Marie EP, Dawn Marie
2016: After All This Time/Young and Bittersweet (singles), The Surly Bells
2016: Disaster in Blue, Amanda Fama
2016: Tammy Jo, Tammy Jo
2016: I Am Enough, Tera Hinzman
2016: Fish Out of Water, Diver Ida
2015: High Tide Adventures, David G Moore
2015: Searching for the American Dream, War Poets
2015: The Small Square, The Small Square
2015: Laugh in the Dark, Tommy Keene
2015: Somewhere in Durand, Biesterveld
2015: Light Over There, Light Over There
2015: Action and Heroes, Three Hour Tour
2015: Freeway, Whale House
2015: American Police State, War Poets
2014: Paint the Fence, John Lynch
2014: Hot and Cold, War Poets
2013: This Old Town, Biesterveld
2013: The New Romantic, Randy Forte and the Reconstruction
2012: Eleven Steps from Where You Are, Randy Forte and the Reconstruction
2011: Ignition, Shoes
2011: Three, Catchpenny
2011: Wonder Falling Under, Randy Forte and the Reconstruction
2010: Tommy Keene You Hear Me: A Retrospective 1983-2009, Tommy Keene
2010: The Martyrs Remixed and Remastered, The Martyrs
2010: No Chocolate Cake, Gin Blossoms
2010: Never The First To Jump, David G. Moore
2010: Looking For Tomorrow, Three Hour Tour
2009: In The Late Bright, Tommy Keene
2008: I.S.O. (In Search Of), Weird Summer
2007: B Side Oblivion, Three Hour Tour
2006: Blues & Boogie Shoes, The Keene Brothers (Robert Pollard and Tommy Keene)
2006: Crashing the Ether, Tommy Keene
2004: Drowning—A Tommy Keene Miscellany, Tommy Keene
2003: Modern American Female Gut, Robynn Ragland
2002: The Merry-Go-Round Broke Down, Tommy Keene
2002: Chemistry, The Dygmies
2001: Showtunes, Tommy Keene
2001: The Palace at 4am, Part I, Jay Bennett & Edward Burch
2001: Demolition, Adam Schmitt
2000: Modern American Female Gut, Robynn Ragland
2000: Paragraph Thirteen, Robynn Ragland
1999: Incarnata Mysterica, Weird Summer
1998: Isolation Party, Tommy Keene
1997: Race to Mars, The Dygmies
1997: The Nerk Twins, (Jeff Murphy)
1996: Their Titanic Majesty's Request, Titanic Love Affair (Jay Bennett)
1996: Better Off At Home, Bludgers
1996: Ten Years After, Tommy Keene
1996: 1969, Three Hour Tour
1996: Day One, Figurehead
1995: Tore a Hole, Shoes
1995: Fret Buzz, Shoes
1994: Driving Into The Sun, Tommy Keene
1993: The Real Underground, Tommy Keene
1993: Illiterature, Adam Schmitt
1993: Yellow Pills: Best of American Pop 1, Tommy Keene and Adam Schmitt
1992: Sleeping on a Roller Coaster, Tommy Keene
1992: The Pilgrim, Joey Molland (Badfinger)
1991: World So Bright, Adam Schmitt
1983: The Martyrs, The Martyrs

References

External links 
 John Louis Richardson's website
 John Louis Richardson's MySpace
 Drum Farm Studio website

1964 births
Alternative rock drummers
American alternative rock musicians
American rock drummers
Gin Blossoms members
Living people
Musicians from Champaign, Illinois
Power pop musicians
20th-century American drummers
American male drummers